The 2018/19 FIS Cup (ski jumping) was the 14th FIS Cup season in ski jumping for men and the 7th for ladies.

Other competitive circuits this season include the World Cup, Grand Prix, Continental Cup, FIS Race and Alpen Cup.

Calendar

Men

Ladies

Overall standings

Men

Ladies

References 

2018 in ski jumping
2019 in ski jumping
FIS Cup (ski jumping)

pl:FIS Cup w skokach narciarskich 2018/2019